Concrete is an unincorporated community in DeWitt County, in the U.S. state of Texas.

History
Concrete was founded in 1846, making it one of the county's oldest communities. A post office was established at Concrete in 1853, and remained in operation until 1907. With the construction of the railroad in 1873, business activity shifted to nearby towns, and the Concrete's population dwindled

References

Unincorporated communities in DeWitt County, Texas
Unincorporated communities in Texas